3-(2-furoyl)-quinoline-2-carboxaldehyde (FQ) is a fluorogenic amine labeling dye that is not fluorescent itself,  but reacts with primary amines to form fluorescent products. It has been used for the detection of amines and peptides, largely in CE-SDS, where it is recognized to reach a silver stain-like high sensitivity via laser-induced fluorescence. Once bound to protein the excitation wavelength is 480 nm (blue) and the emission wavelength is ~600 nm (orange).

See also
 Fluorescamine

References

Dyes
Quinolines
Aldehydes
Furanones